Leire is a village and civil parish in the Harborough district, in the county of Leicestershire, England. The name is thought to originate from the old British name for the river Soar, which has a tributary with a source south of the village.
Present day Leire has a population of around 500, measured at 587 in the 2011 census. The village is north of Lutterworth.

Today Leire has two public houses the Queens arms and the crab and cow, a church, a village hall and a riding establishment.

Leire Village Hall is home to Leire pre-school group, Leire and Dunton Scout Group (which has a Beaver, Cub and Scout section) and a Pilates class.

References

External links

History of Leire (England)
Leire Parish Council

Villages in Leicestershire
Civil parishes in Harborough District